Huntcliff School may refer to:

 Huntcliff School, Kirton in Lindsey, a secondary school in Lincolnshire, England
 Huntcliff School, Saltburn-by-the-Sea, a secondary school in North Yorkshire, England